Prociphilus is an aphid genus of the subfamily Eriosomatinae, which cause the plants they attack to produce galls. The aphids reside and feed within the gall.

There are around 50 species in this genus.

The appearance of Prociphilus oriens is often said to presage the first snowfall in Hokkaido and Tohoku. Prociphilus oriens is commonly called , literally translating to "snow bug", in Japan.

Species
These species belong to the genus Prociphilus:

 Prociphilus americanus (Walker, 1852)
 Prociphilus aomoriensis (Matsumura, 1917)
 Prociphilus aurus Zhang & Qiao, 1997
 Prociphilus baicalensis (Cholodkovsky, 1920)
 Prociphilus bumeliae (Schrank, 1801)
 Prociphilus carolinensis Smith, 1969
 Prociphilus caryae (Fitch, 1856)
 Prociphilus chaenomelis
 Prociphilus cheni Tao, 1970
 Prociphilus clerodendri Okamoto & Takahashi, 1927
 Prociphilus cornifoliae Singh, Das & Raychaudhuri, 1977
 Prociphilus corrugatans (Sirrine, 1894)
 Prociphilus crataegicola Shinji, 1922
 Prociphilus crataegistrobi (Smith, 1969)
 Prociphilus dilonicerae Zhang, 1981
 Prociphilus emeiensis Zhang, 1997
 Prociphilus erigeronensis (Thomas, 1879)
 Prociphilus formosanus Takahashi, 1935
 Prociphilus fraxini (Fabricius, 1777)
 Prociphilus fraxinifolii (Riley, 1879)
 Prociphilus gambosae Zhang & Zhang, 1993
 Prociphilus ghanii Hille Ris Lambers, 1973
 Prociphilus himalayaensis Chakrabarti, 1976
 Prociphilus konoi Hori, 1938
 Prociphilus kuwanai Monzen, 1927
 Prociphilus laricis Shinji, 1941
 Prociphilus ligustrifoliae (Tseng & Tao, 1938)
 Prociphilus longianus Smith, 1974
 Prociphilus lonicerae Shinji, 1943
 Prociphilus mexicanus Remaudière & Muñoz Viveros, 1985
 Prociphilus micheliae Hille Ris Lambers, 1933
 Prociphilus oleae (Leach, 1826)
 Prociphilus oriens Mordvilko, 1935
 Prociphilus osmanthae Essig & Kuwana, 1918
 Prociphilus pergandei Smith, 1974
 Prociphilus piceaerubensis (Smith, 1969)
 Prociphilus pini (Burmeister, 1835)
 Prociphilus piniradicivorus Smith, 1969
 Prociphilus probosceus Sanborn, 1904
 Prociphilus sasakii Monzen, 1927
 Prociphilus take (Shinji, 1922)
 Prociphilus taukogi
 Prociphilus taxus (Ghosh, Chakrabarti, Chowdhuri & Raychaudhuri, 1969)
 Prociphilus tessellatus (Fitch, 1851) (woolly alder aphid)
 Prociphilus trinus Zhang, 1997
 Prociphilus umarovi
 Prociphilus ushikoroshi Shinji, 1924
 Prociphilus vesicalis (Rudow, 1875)
 Prociphilus xylostei (De Geer, 1773)

In popular culture 
A list of depictions of genus Prociphilus in popular culture:
 In Aria the Animation, a larger-than-normal variant of the "snow bug" is depicted as living on Aqua (formerly Mars).

References

External links

Sternorrhyncha genera
Taxa named by Carl Ludwig Koch
Eriosomatinae

ja:トドノネオオワタムシ